This is a list of companies founded by University of Pennsylvania alumni, including attendees who enrolled in degree-programs at University of Pennsylvania (UPenn) but did not eventually graduate. This list is not exhaustive, as it only includes notable companies of which the founding and development history is well recorded by reliable sources. In particular, subsidiaries are listed with their owners in parentheses.

University of Pennsylvania is a highly entrepreneurial university and its alumni have founded a variety of companies. According to PitchBook, from 2006 to 2017, UPenn produced 788 company founders as alumni or current students, creating 712 companies, fifth most among all universities in the world.

In this list, founders of a company which merged with other companies to form a new company are counted as founders of the new company. However, founders of a company which later dissolved into several successor companies are not counted as founders of those successor companies; this same rule applies to spin-off companies. Finally, a defunct company is a company that had stopped functioning completely (e.g., bankrupt) without dissolving, merging or being acquired.

Top companies by revenues

Fortune Global 500 (2017) 
This list shows companies in Fortune Global 500 founded or co-founded by UPenn alumni. The cut-off revenue for 2017 Fortune Global 500 companies was $21,609M in 2016.

*: Merger of different companies, at least one of which was founded by UPenn alumni.

Fortune 1000 (2017) 
This list shows companies in Fortune 1000 (only for companies within the U.S.) founded or co-founded by UPenn alumni. The cut-off revenue for 2017 Fortune 1000 companies was $1,791M in 2016.

*: Merger of different companies, at least one of which was founded by UPenn alumni.

Former Fortune-listed companies 
For each company, only the latest rankings (up to three years) are shown in this list.

Timeline

Index 
This index also contains companies listed in section "Notable defunct & dissolved".

Year 2000 – present

Year 1980 – 1999

Year 1960 – 1979

Before 1960

Notable defunct & dissolved

See also 

 List of companies founded by Harvard University alumni
 List of companies founded by MIT alumni
 List of companies founded by Stanford University alumni
 List of companies founded by UC Berkeley alumni
 List of University of Pennsylvania people
 List of Wharton School alumni

References 

University of Pennsylvania
University of Pennsylvania alumni